WKSH-LP (97.7 FM) is a radio station licensed to Shreveport, Louisiana, United States. The station is currently owned by Amore Entertainment Radio.

References

External links
 

Radio stations in Louisiana
Low-power FM radio stations in Louisiana